Bortolazzi is an Italian surname. Notable people with the surname include:

Bartolomeo Bortolazzi (1773–1820), Italian classical musician, composer, and author
Etta Bortolazzi (1926–2000), Croatian and Yugoslav theater, radio, TV and film actress
Mario Bortolazzi (born 1965), Italian footballer and manager

See also
Bortoluzzi

Italian-language surnames